Navid Fløe Dayyani (born February 17, 1987) is a Danish businessman and former football player, who played for Aarhus Gymnastik Forening in the Danish 1st Division. He was born to an Iranian father and a Danish mother.

Career 
Dayyani started playing football at fifteen and by the time he was seventeen landed a contract with Aarhus Gymnastik Forening who are currently in the Superliga. In 2003, Dayyani became the youngest player ever to get his debut in the Superliga. At the age of 16 years and 244 days, he succeeded Mads Beierholm's old record of 16 years and 256 days. Dayyani had to stop his promising career in 2007 because of injuries and a weak knee.

In 2008, he moved to Tehran, Iran with his older brother Shahin Dayyani, and today the two of them own a series of Canon showrooms across the city.

International career 
Dayyani has represented numerous Danish youth teams.

References

External links 
 Danish national team profile 

1987 births
Living people
Danish men's footballers
Iranian footballers
Aarhus Gymnastikforening players
Danish people of Iranian descent
Sportspeople of Iranian descent
Association football midfielders